The 2001 Challenge Cup (officially known as the 2001 Silk Cut Challenge Cup for sponsorship reasons) is a rugby league football tournament which began its preliminary stages in December 2000 and ended with the final on 28 April 2001. Bradford Bulls were the reigning champions, following their 24–18 victory over Leeds Rhinos in the 2000 Challenge Cup at Murrayfield Stadium.

Round 1
Ties were scheduled to be played over the weekend of 2–3 December 2000, although two matches did not take place until 9 and 16 December.

Round 2
Ties were due to be played over the weekend of 16–17 December 2000 but the round was not completed until 13 January 2001.

Notes
A. After extra time

Round 3
Ties were played over the weekend of 26–28 January 2001.

Round 4
Ties were played between 10–14 February 2001

Round 5
The fifth round fixtures were played over the weekend of 24–25 February 2001.

Quarter-finals
The quarter finals was played over the weekend of 9–11 March 2001

Semi-finals
The ties were played on 31 March and 1 April 2001.

Final 
The 100th Challenge Cup final was played on 28 April 2001 and was the first to be played at Twickenham Stadium. Hear'Say performed before the match. St Helen's stand off Sean Long was the winner of the Lance Todd Trophy.

Teams
St Helens: Paul Wellens, Sean Hoppe, Kevin Iro, Paul Newlove, Anthony Sullivan; Tommy Martyn, Sean Long, David Fairleigh, Keiron Cunningham, Sonny Nickle, Chris Joynt (c), Peter Shiels, Paul Sculthorpe 
Subs: Steve Hall, Anthony Stewart, Vila Matautia, Tim Jonkers Coach: Ian Millward

Bradford: Michael Withers, Tevita Vaikona, Scott Naylor, Shane Rigon, Leon Pryce, Henry Paul, Robbie Paul (c), Joe Vagana, James Lowes, Brian McDermott, Jamie Peacock, Daniel Gartner, Mike Forshaw
Subs: Paul Deacon, Paul Anderson, Lee Gilmour, Stuart Fielden  Coach: Brian Noble

UK Broadcasting rights
The tournament was screened in the United Kingdom by the BBC.

References

External links
 Challenge Cup on the Rugby Football League's website

Challenge Cup
St Helens R.F.C.
Challenge Cup
Challenge Cup
Challenge Cup
Challenge Cup